John Brown (born 6 March 1940) is a Scottish former footballer who played as a wing half in the Football League for Colchester United.

Career

Born in Edinburgh, Brown began his career with the Scottish junior club Dunbar United. He earned a move to English Football League side Colchester United in 1962 where he made one league appearance for the U's. He made his debut for Colchester in the League Cup during a 2–0 second round defeat at Northampton Town on 26 September 1962. Following this came his league debut and solitary appearance at Layer Road, a 1–1 draw with Halifax Town on 27 October, and his final appearance came in the subsequent game, an FA Cup tie with non-league Wimbledon in the first round that ended in a 2–1 defeat.

After leaving Colchester, Brown returned to Scotland to play for Stenhousemuir, and later moved to Australia to play for George Cross.

References

1940 births
Living people
Footballers from Edinburgh
Scottish footballers
Association football wing halves
Dunbar United F.C. players
Colchester United F.C. players
Stenhousemuir F.C. players
Caroline Springs George Cross FC players
English Football League players
Scottish expatriate sportspeople in Australia
Scottish expatriate footballers